Glyntawe is a hamlet and parish on the upper reaches of the River Tawe in Powys, Wales, in the community of Tawe-Uchaf.
It has always been sparsely populated. Today it attracts tourists for outdoor activities in the Brecon Beacons National Park and for caving.

Location
A Topographical Dictionary of Wales (1849) describes Glyntawe as, "a chapelry, attached to the parish of Devynock, in the hundred of Devynock, union and county of Brecknock, South Wales, 15 miles (W. S. W.) from Brecknock. It is situated at the south-western extremity of the extensive parish of Devynock, in a vale between elevated and dreary mountains, not far from the source of the river Tawe."
Theophilus Jones in 1809 wrote of Devynock parish that,

Prehistory
A prehistoric site at Waun Fignen Felen, Glyntawe, has been carefully studied by paleo-ecologists and archaeologists. 
During the Mesolithic the area contained a small open lake that was gradually choked by weeds.
At first it was surrounded by open country, but later this gradually changed to woodland.
Stone tools and debris from knapping from the early and late Mesolithic were found in different locations around the lake.
They seem to have been occupied only for short periods, and perhaps were hunting camps.
Tools at the site are made of stones from some distance away, perhaps acquired by trade.

The Ogof yr Esgyrn cave at the source of the Afon Llynfell, part of a very large system of solution caves under the Cribarth plateau to the west of the upper Tawe, was discovered in 1922 and excavated between 1923 and 1950.
Finds date from the post-glacial period through the Roman era to historic times.
The cave was used for habitation and for burial.  The strata from different eras were mixed together, and included a bronze rapier, bronze razor, bronze awl, gold bead, bone awl and weaving comb, as well as pottery sherds from the Bronze Age.

History
In the Tudor period the Lord of Brecon owned several corn mills, including one in Glyntawe, called Melin Gaeth in Welsh, the villain's mill, where the villeins had to grind their corn. When Edward Stafford, 3rd Duke of Buckingham, was convicted of treason they became the property of the crown. 
Queen Elizabeth I of England granted the mills to one of the Herberts of Crickadarn for sixty years.
In 1633 a decree of court established the right to compel tenants of the manor to bring their corn to the mills to be ground.

In 1836 a chapel in the parish of Defynnog, Brecknockshire, was dedicated to Saint Callwen.
Capel Colwyn or St Colwen's in Callwen, Glyntawe, was a chapel of ease to Defynnog until around 1868, when Glyntawe became a separate parish.
The Imperial Gazetteer of England and Wales (1870–72) described Glyntawe as "a hamlet-chapelry in Devynnock parish, Breconshire; 7½ miles W of Brecon town and r. station. Post town, Brecon. Pop., 99. Houses, 20. The living is a p. curacy in the diocese of St. David's. Value, £80. Patron, the Vicar of Devynnock."
On 1 July 1893 a new Church of Saint Callewn was substituted for the older building in the parish of Glyntawe by Basil Jones, bishop of St David's.
Historical census figures for the hamlet of Glyntawe are:

1841 - 118 people
1851 - 107
1861 - 99
1871 - 102 
1881 - 133
1891 - 144
1901 - 147	 

The community was never industrialized. 
The people of Glyntawe would have farmed, worked in the quarries or in Penwyllt brickworks, or perhaps worked at Craig-y-Nos Castle.
The church was rededicated to  St John the Baptist in 1964–65, although it is still called Callwen Church by the locals.
The school in Callwen was closed in 1970.

Today
The rural community of Glyntawe, which includes the hamlet of Callwen, is part of the Community of Trecastle.
The school is now the Glyntawe Outdoor Centre, an activity centre run by Dulwich College.
Also called the Dulwich College Field Centre, this is a hostel that can sleep up to 40 people, and makes a base for outdoor activities such as hiking, mountain biking, caving or fishing.
Glyntawe contains the National Showcaves of Wales at Dan yr Ogof, a major tourist attraction.
This is part of a large system of caves which includes the Ogof yr Esgyrn.
Craig-y-Nos Castle is very close to Glyntawe.

Notes

Sources

 

Populated places in Powys